The Blue Moth is a 1959 West German drama film directed by Wolfgang Schleif and starring Zarah Leander, Christian Wolff and Paul Hartmann. Leander, who had been a major star during the Nazi era, made a comeback in the 1950s. By 1959, in her penultimate film, she was playing a more mature role than the traditional divas in her earlier films.

Cast
 Zarah Leander as Julia Martens
 Christian Wolff as Thomas Martens
 Paul Hartmann as Lawyer Dr. Frahm
 Werner Hinz as Steve Owens
 Marina Petrova as Irina
 Loni Heuser as Elvira del Castros
 Lotte Brackebusch as Alte Frau Martens
 Hans Richter as Regisseur Olten
 Lore Schulz as Hausmädchen Elli
 Ingrid van Bergen as Revuegirl
 Karl Martell as Direktor
 Erwin Linder as Prosecutor
 Hans Paetsch as Richter
 Carl Voscherau as Pförtner Becker
 Walter Klam as Oberarzt
 Kurt A. Jung as Barkeeper Freddy

References

Bibliography 
 Anne Commire & Deborah Klezmer. Women in World History: A Biographical Encyclopedia, Volume 9. Yorkin Publications, 1999.

External links 
 

1959 films
West German films
German drama films
1959 drama films
1950s German-language films
Films directed by Wolfgang Schleif
1950s German films